NEEC may refer to:

National Express East Coast
North of England Education Conference